Lake Livingston is a reservoir located in the East Texas Piney Woods. Lake Livingston was built and is owned and operated by the Trinity River Authority (TRA) of Texas  under contract with the City of Houston for water-supply purposes. The lake is the third-largest lake located in the state of Texas (only the Sam Rayburn Reservoir and lake Toledo Bend are larger).

Construction 

The lake construction was paid for by the sale of revenue bonds that were to be redeemed with income derived from the sale of water. The dam construction began in 1966 and was completed in 1969, by Forrest and Cotton, Incorporated. The cost to build the earthen dam was US$83,996,957 ($603,985,378 in 2021 dollars).

Use 
Water stored in the lake is used to supply industrial, municipal, and agricultural needs in the lower Trinity River Basin and the Houston/Galveston metropolitan area. Its significance in the face of the extraordinary growth experienced by this region of the upper Texas Gulf Coast is tremendous. Many public and commercial recreation facilities, including full-service marinas, camping, and motel accommodations are located along the shoreline. The City of Houston owns two-thirds of the water rights of the lake, with the other third remaining under the control of the TRA.

The lake 
The earthfill dam has a concrete spillway and was designed by Brown and Root, Incorporated (now KBR, Inc). The spillway is designed and constructed to pass flows of three times the maximum recorded flow of the river at this site.

Flood control 
Lake Livingston was built with no flood control or flood-storage capabilities, and because of this, all water entering the lake, whether it be from rainfall or inflow, must exit the lake as increased intake occurs. Flow through the dam is controlled by 12 tainter gates in a concrete and steel spillway that has an average depth of 55 feet. Operations of the spillway mirrors river flow, so within a relatively short period of time, increase of river flow, discharge is increased, and vice versa.

Hurricane Rita 
On September 23, 2005, rain and winds from Hurricane Rita caused waves up to 4 feet (1 m) in height to pound against the Lake Livingston dam. As a result, 11,000 feet (3.4 km) of large protective stones, or riprap, were stripped from the upstream face of the dam. To repair the damage, the TRA lowered the lake's pool level by 4 feet to 127 feet, preventing any further erosion of the exposed earthen embankment. The Federal Emergency Management Agency  and the City of Houston footed the $9.6 million repair bill and awarded the repair contract to Archer Western Contractors. Over the course of the repair, movement of 72,215 tons of 32-inch rock in 3,183 truckloads and 15,808 tons of 8-inch (200 mm) bedding rock in 687 truckloads was required. The rock was mined from a quarry in Navarro County near Corsicana. Work was largely completed by April 28, 2006, but due to severe drought, the lake's regular pool level was not reached until November, 2006.

Entertainment references 
Joe McKinney and Michael McCarty's "Lost Girl of the Lake" is a 2012 Bram Stoker Award Finalist from the Horror Writers Association, that takes place at Lake Livingston in the 1960s.
Lake Livingston was featured on the third episode of the first season of the television show, River Monsters, which airs on Animal Planet. The host, Jeremy Wade, was searching for alligator gar.

References

External links 

Trinity River Authority of Texas – Lake Livingston
Trinity River Authority of Texas – Water supply

TexasRiverData.com
Lake Livingston Home page 
Experience Lake Livingston

Livingston
Trinity River (Texas)
Bodies of water of Polk County, Texas
Bodies of water of San Jacinto County, Texas
Bodies of water of Trinity County, Texas
Bodies of water of Walker County, Texas
Livingston
Protected areas of Polk County, Texas
Protected areas of San Jacinto County, Texas
Protected areas of Trinity County, Texas
Protected areas of Walker County, Texas